The Triumph Daytona 650 is a super sports bike built by British manufacturer Triumph Motorcycles in 2005.

It was superseded by the three cylinder Triumph Daytona 675 released in 2006.

Specifications

References

Daytona 650